

Plants

Ferns

Conifers

Angiosperms

Invertebrates

Mollusks

Conodonts

Fish

Archosauriformes

Non-avian dinosaurs
Data courtesy of George Olshevsky's dinosaur genera list.

Birds

Pterodactyls

Expeditions, field work, and fossil discoveries
 Trexler found hadrosaur remains west of Choteau, Montana in strata of the Two Medicine Formation.

Popular culture

Literature
 The Year of the Dinosaur Edwin H. Colbert and illustrated by his wife, Margaret was published. This story describes a year in the life of a "brontosaur" and was an attempt to educate the reader about prehistory through a fictional portrayal of it.

References

 
Paleontology
Paleontology 7